South Coventry may refer to the following places in the United States:

South Coventry (CDP), Connecticut
South Coventry Historic District
South Coventry Township, Chester County, Pennsylvania

See also
Coventry (disambiguation)